Thakre (Nepali: थाक्रे; thakre) is a Gaupalika(Nepali: गाउपालिका ; gaupalika)(Formerly: village development committee) in Dhading District. The local body was formed by merging four VDCs namely Bhumesthan, Tasarphu, Thakre, Kebalpur and Goganpani, Bagmati (Ward No. 5,6,7,8). Currently, it has a total of 11 wards. The population of the rural municipality is 32,914 according to the data collected on 2017 Nepalese local elections.

Demographics
At the time of the 2011 Nepal census, Thakre Rural Municipality had a population of 32,979.
Of these, 64.8% spoke Nepali, 33.6% Tamang, 0.4% Newar, 0.2% Chepang, 0.2% Magar, 0.2% Maithili, 0.2% Urdu, 0.1% Hindi, 0.1% Bhojpuri, 0.1% Gurung, 0.1% Rai and 0.1% other languages as their first language.

In terms of ethnicity/caste, 35.9% were Tamang, 21.0% Chhetri, 19.3% Hill Brahmin, 3.8% Kami, 3.4% Magar, 3.1% Newar, 2.8% Rai, 2.2% Damai/Dholi, 2.1% Gharti/Bhujel, 1.5% Chepang/Praja, 0.9% Kamar, 0.9% Sarki, 0.7% Sanyasi/Dasnami, 0.7% Thakuri, 0.4% Musalman, 0.3% Badi, 0.3% Gurung, 0.1% Kalwar, 0.1% Ghale, 0.1% Limbu and 0.3% others.

In terms of religion, 65.7% were Hindu, 31.7% Buddhist, 1.9% Christian, 0.4% Muslim, 0.1% Prakriti and 0.1% others.

In terms of literacy, 65.2% could both read and write, 2.9% could read but not write and 31.8% could neither read nor write.

Geography 
East: Dhunibesi Municipality

West: Galchhi Gaupalika

North: Galchhi Gaupalika and Nuwakot District

South: Makawanpur District

Population 
As per 2017, Thakre hosts a population of 32,914 across a total area of 96.41 km2.

See also
Dhading District

References

Populated places in Dhading District
Rural municipalities in Dhading District
Rural municipalities of Nepal established in 2017